"Pocket" is the 3rd single from Sam Sparro's eponymous debut album, released in 2008.

Release Information 
"Pocket" was first played on Australian radio in November 2008. It was released onto the Australian iTunes Store on December 13 of the same year. The download consists of the song "Pocket" and the B-Side, "Gypsy Woman (She's Homeless)", a cover of Crystal Waters 1991 hit. "Pocket" was originally intended to be released as an international single, but its release was halted abruptly after only having been released in Australia.

Track listing
Digital download
"Pocket" – 3:39
"Gypsy Woman (She's Homeless)" – 3:28

Personnel
Credits adapted from the liner notes of Sam Sparro.

 Paul Epworth - writing, production
 Sam Falson – vocals, writing
 Dan Grech-Marugerat – mixing

Charts
The single has peaked at #33 on the Australia Airplay Chart.

References

2009 singles
Sam Sparro songs
2008 songs
Songs written by Paul Epworth
Island Records singles
Songs written by Sam Sparro
Song recordings produced by Paul Epworth